Lighthouse is the fifth studio album by American musician David Crosby, released on October 21, 2016 by GroundUP Music. The cover was photographed at Felgueiras Lighthouse, Oporto, Portugal.

Accolades

Track listing

Personnel 
 David Crosby – vocals, acoustic guitar (1-5, 7, 8), guitar percussion (6), 12-string electric guitar (7)
 Michael League – vocals (1-6, 8, 9), acoustic guitar (1-6, 8, 9), 12-string acoustic guitar (1, 5), electric guitar (1, 2, 4-6, 9), acoustic bass (1, 2, 5, 7, 9), hammertone guitar (2, 9), electric bass (4, 6), guitar percussion (4), baritone guitar (6, 8), 12-string electric guitar (6), double bass (8)
 Cory Henry – organ (6, 8)
 Bill Laurance – acoustic piano (7, 9)
 Becca Stevens – vocals (9)
 Michelle Willis – vocals (9)

Production 
 Michael League – producer 
 Fabrice Dupont – co-producer, recording, mixing 
 Patrick MacDougall – vocal recording (2, 6)
 Bill Lane – assistant engineer 
 Rich Tosi – assistant engineer 
 Ed Wong – assistant engineer 
 Greg Calbi – mastering at Sterling Sound (New York City, New York)
 David Crosby – art direction 
 Jan Dee – art direction 
 Emilia Canas Mendes – artwork 
 Eduardo Texeria de Souza and Bamboo Studios – photography

Charts

References

2016 albums
David Crosby albums
GroundUPmusic albums